Ochakovo-Matveevskoe is an administrative district (raion) of Western Administrative Okrug, and one of the 125 raions of Moscow, Russia. Population: 129,002 (2022 est.). It was formed in 1997 through merging of the Ochakovo and Matveevskoe districts.

See also
Administrative divisions of Moscow

References

Notes

Sources

Districts of Moscow